Cephissus (ancient Greek: Κήφισσος), Cephisus, Kephisos, or Kifisos may refer to:

Waterways in Greece
 Cephissus (Argolis), a river in Argolis, a tributary of the Inachus River
 Cephissus (Boeotia), a river in northern Boeotia
 Cephissus (Athenian plain), a river in Attica flowing through the Athenian plain
 Cephissus (Eleusis), a tributary of the Saronic Gulf from the Eleusinian plain
 Cephissus (Salamis), a river on Salamis Island

Other
 Cephissus (mythology), a man changed into a sea monster by Apollo
 Cephissus, a Martian canal, per List of Martian canals
 Battle of the Cephissus, 15 March 1311 conflict between the Frankish Greek forces of Walter V of Brienne and the mercenaries of the Catalan Company
 Cephisus (spittlebug), a genus of insects in the family Aphrophoridae